Jannik Rochelt (born 27 September 1998) is a German professional footballer who plays as an attacking midfielder or winger for  club SV Elversberg.

Career
Rochelt made his professional debut for Bayern Munich II in the 3. Liga on 20 July 2019, starting in the away match against Würzburger Kickers.

Career statistics

Club

References

External links
 
 

1998 births
Living people
People from Lindau (district)
Sportspeople from Swabia (Bavaria)
Footballers from Bavaria
German footballers
Association football midfielders
FC Memmingen players
FC Bayern Munich II players
SSV Ulm 1846 players
SV Elversberg players
3. Liga players
Regionalliga players